The Bréguet G.111 or alternatively, G.11E was a French passenger coaxial rotors helicopter flown soon after World War II. Only one was built, development ceasing when funding ran out.

Design and development

Louis Bréguet designed his first helicopter, the Bréguet-Richet Gyroplane, in 1908 but his 1935 Gyroplane Laboratoire was much more successful. It had no tail rotor but instead had co-axial contra-rotating rotors. After World War II Bréguet was approached by the Société Francaises du Gyroplane (SFG) for a helicopter capable of carrying several passengers.  Bréguet developed his wartime studies of a project named the G.34 into the two-passenger Bréguet G.11E, otherwise known as the Société Francaises du Gyroplane G.11E.

Though a much larger aircraft, the G.11E used the same coaxial, three blade twin rotor layout as on the Gyroplane Laboratoire. It was initially powered by a fan cooled  Potez 9E nine cylinder radial engine mounted amidships, under the concentric rotor shafts.  There was 6.5:1 speed reduction gearing between the engine and the rotor drive. The rotors are built around tapered tube spars, which carry ribs and are Dural clad at the leading edges and with alloy over 3-ply elsewhere. They are mounted on flapping hinges and have drag hinge dampers. The control column alters cyclic pitch via a pair of swashplates and pedals make torque corrections and control yaw by changing the relative collective pitch of the two rotors. A mechanical inertial governor limited rotor accelerations; the pilot could increase the collective pitch over that set by the governor but not below it, emergencies apart.

The G.11E's fuselage has a tapered, oval section. The forward part is a light alloy monocoque containing the well glazed cockpit, accessed by two sliding doors. The rear fuselage is a steel tube structure, covered in fabric, bearing a tall T-tail with a moving, one-piece tailplane which corrected the cyclic pitch via the control column to prevent once per revolution pitch oscillations. A wide track undercarriage has main wheels mounted on horizontal V-struts from the fuselage bottom and with a single bracing strut to the mid-fuselage on each side.

The first flight was made on 21 May 1949 but tests showed that the G.11E was underpowered, so a decision was made to replace the Potez engine with a bigger nine-cylinder radial, a  Pratt & Whitney Wasp Junior.

The G.111 began flight tests in 1951 but these were not completed as SFG were declared bankrupt the following year.

Variants
G.11ETwo passengers, Potez 9E engine.
G.111 Four passengers, G.11E re-engined with Wasp Junior, enlarged.

Specifications (G.11E)

See also

References

Coaxial rotor helicopters
1940s French helicopters
G.11E
Single-engined piston helicopters